Groves Creek is a river located in Seneca County, New York. It flows into Cayuga Lake by Weyers Point, New York.

Rivers of Seneca County, New York
Rivers of New York (state)